Leotis Harris (born June 28, 1955 in Little Rock, Arkansas) is a former American football offensive guard in the National Football League (NFL). He played his entire six-year career for the Green Bay Packers.  He attended the University of Arkansas.  Harris is also a member of the Arkansas Razorbacks All-Century Team.

On November 10, 2014 Harris was inducted into the Southwest Conference Hall of Fame.

References

1955 births
Living people
All-American college football players
American football offensive guards
Arkansas Razorbacks football players
Green Bay Packers players
Sportspeople from Little Rock, Arkansas